Michal Grman (born 25 October 1993) is a Slovak football midfielder who currently plays for MFK Topvar Topoľčany.

FC Nitra
He made his debut for FC Nitra against MFK Ružomberok on 21 July 2012.

External links
Futbalnet profile

References

1993 births
Living people
Slovak footballers
Association football midfielders
FC Nitra players
MFK Topvar Topoľčany players
Slovak Super Liga players